Hypericum hircinum, also known as stinking tutsan, is a shrubby flowering plant in the St. John's wort family Hypericaceae.

Description
The species grows to be 2 meters tall. It has a branching base with grey-brown bark. Its leaves give off a goat-like scent when crushed (caproic acid).

Distribution
Hypericum hircinum is found around the Mediterranean, specifically in France, Spain, Italy, Greece, Turkey, and Saudi Arabia. The species was naturalized in Britain as early as 1620. The species does not spread rapidly into natural vegetation, and so has very little spread.

Subspecies
Hypericum hircinum has five accepted subspecies:
H. hircinum subsp. albimontanum
H. hircinum subsp. cambessedesii
H. hircinum subsp. hircinum
H. hircinum subsp. majus
H. hircinum subsp. metroi

References

hircinum
Plants described in 1753
Taxa named by Carl Linnaeus